was a town located in Ogi District, Saga Prefecture, Japan. The status of Ushizu was changed from a village to a town on April 24, 1894.

As of 2003, the town had an estimated population of 10,429 and a density of 786.50 persons per km2. The total area was 13.26 km2.

On March 1, 2005, Ushizu, along with the towns of Ogi (former), Ashikari and Mikatsuki (all from Ogi District), was merged to create the city of Ogi.

Dissolved municipalities of Saga Prefecture